Guy Eby (November 9, 1918  – July 30, 2021) was an American airline captain who kept the commercial airplane he was flying (American Airlines Flight 182) from colliding with another one (TWA Flight 37) on November 26, 1975, following a mistake from an air traffic controller in Cleveland, Ohio.

Early life
Eby was born on November 9, 1918, in Ephrata, Pennsylvania. He received the Air Medal in 1946 for his services for United States Navy (1938–1950) against Japan in 1945 towards the end of World War II. He flew in the Berlin Blockade. He joined American Airlines in 1950.

1975 flight incident

The two planes, combinedly carrying 319 passengers and crew members (192 passengers and 13 crew members on board American Airlines Flight 182 while 103 passengers and 11 crew members on board TWA Flight 37), were reportedly just 30 metres away from each other as they flew over the city of  Carleton, Michigan. Eby's plane (an American Airlines DC-10 flying that day as Flight 182) was headed towards Newark, New Jersey from Chicago, Illinois. Eby's plane had originated in San Francisco. The other plane (a TWA Lockheed L-1011 TriStar flying that day as Flight 37) was heading from Philadelphia, Pennsylvania to Los Angeles, California. Eby quickly lowered his plane's altitude at 35,000 ft amidst a significant cloud cover, an action which ultimately saved the lives of his passengers and the flight crew. All 10 flight attendants and 14 passengers did suffer injuries on the American Airlines plane while serving dinner, and it was forced to make an emergency landing in Detroit. At the time, he had already logged flight time of nearly 22,000 hours. Had the collision not been avoided, it would have been the greatest aviation disaster in the history of United States up to that time.

The Trans World Airlines plane involved in this incident was later destroyed by a fire on July 30, 1992, while flying as TWA Flight 843.

Later life
Eby retired from American Airlines in 1978. Eby turned 100 on November 9, 2018, in Ormond Beach, Florida, where he had resided since 1983. One of the passengers in the American Airlines Flight 182, Burt Herman (who was flying with his wife Elaine, his twin daughters Laura and Leslie and son Larry at that time), wrote and published a book about Eby and the incident, called Eby: Master of the Moment in 2018. He died in Ormond Beach on July 30, 2021, at the age of 102.

References

1918 births
2021 deaths
American centenarians
Aviators from Pennsylvania
Commercial aviators
Men centenarians
People from Ephrata, Pennsylvania
Recipients of the Air Medal
United States Navy personnel of World War II